Charles Joseph Doherty,  (May 11, 1855 – July 28, 1931) was a Canadian politician and lawyer.

Early life and education

Doherty was born in Montreal, Quebec, the son of Marcus Doherty, an Irish-born judge of the Supreme Court for the Province of Quebec and Elizabeth (O'Halloran) Doherty. He attended St. Mary's (Jesuit) College and received a Bachelor of Laws degree from McGill University in 1876 winning the Elizabeth Torrance Gold Medal for highest academic achievement.

Career
Doherty was admitted to the bar in 1877. He was a candidate for the Legislative Assembly of Quebec for the electoral district of Montreal West in the 1881 election, but was defeated. In 1885 he served as a lieutenant with the 65th Battalion, Mount Royal Rifles in the North-West Rebellion. He ran for office again for Montreal Centre in the 1886 election.

Doherty was created a Queen's Counsel in 1887. He worked as a lawyer and also taught civil and International law at McGill University prior to being appointed a judge on the Quebec Superior Court from 1891 until 1906. During this time he served as the president of the main Irish fraternal organization in Montreal, St. Patrick's Society in 1902 and 1903.  In 1909 he became a professor of international and civil law at McGill University.

He was elected as the Conservative candidate to the House of Commons of Canada for the electoral district of St. Anne in the 1908 federal election. When the Tories won the 1911 election, the new Prime Minister, Sir Robert Borden, brought Doherty into the Canadian Cabinet as Minister of Justice.

Doherty played a role in the creation of the Canadian Bar Association in 1912 and served as its president in 1914.

At the end of World War I, Doherty was one of the Canadian delegates to the Versailles Peace Conference, and served as Canadian delegate to the League of Nations from 1920 to 1922. He was appointed to the Imperial Privy Council in the 1920 New Year Honours for his service at Versailles, allowing him to use the title of "The Right Honourable".

Doherty remained Minister of Justice in the government of Arthur Meighen until its defeat in 1921.

Archives 

There is a Charles Joseph Doherty fonds at Library and Archives Canada.

See also
 Guelph Raid

References

External links
 
 Charles Joseph Doherty at The Canadian Encyclopedia

1855 births
1931 deaths
Lawyers from Montreal
Judges in Quebec
Canadian legal scholars
Conservative Party of Canada (1867–1942) MPs
Anglophone Quebec people
Members of the House of Commons of Canada from Quebec
Canadian members of the Privy Council of the United Kingdom
Members of the King's Privy Council for Canada
McGill University Faculty of Law alumni
Academic staff of the McGill University Faculty of Law
Politicians from Montreal
Quebec people of Irish descent
Canadian King's Counsel
Contributors to the Catholic Encyclopedia
International law scholars
Canadian Roman Catholics
League of Nations people